Cyanohypsa is a genus of moths in the family Noctuidae. It contains the single species Cyanohypsa stefanellii, which is found in Argentina. Both the genus and species were first described by Eugenio Giacomelli in 1911; it was historically misclassified, but in 2010 was determined to belong to the subfamily Agaristinae.

References

Agaristinae
Monotypic moth genera
Moths of South America